Acleris effractana, the hook-winged tortrix moth, is a moth of the family Tortricidae. It was described by Jacob Hübner in 1799. It has a Holarctic distribution. In Europe, it is found from northern Europe to the northern part of central Europe. It is also present in north-western Russia, Japan, Canada and the northwestern United States.

The wingspan is 21–23 mm. The forewings are brownish fuscous with thin lines and groups of blackish erect scales. The hindwings are light grey. It is very similar to Acleris emargana.

The larvae feed on Salix pentandra, Salix purpurea and Salix cinerea. They live between leaves spun together in the terminal shoots of their host plant. The larvae are bluish green. Larvae can be found from June to the beginning of October.

References

 Acleris effractana in ukmoths

External links

Lepiforum

Moths described in 1799
effractana
Tortricidae of Europe
Moths of Asia
Moths of North America